The 1986 Ball State Cardinals football team was an American football team that represented Ball State University in the Mid-American Conference (MAC) during the 1986 NCAA Division I-A football season. In its second season under head coach Paul Schudel, the team compiled a 6–5 record (4–4 against conference opponents) and finished in a three-way tie for fifth place out of nine teams in the MAC. The team played its home games at Ball State Stadium in Muncie, Indiana.

The team's statistical leaders included Wade Kosakowski with 1,459 passing yards, Carlton Campbell with 688 rushing yards, and Deon Chester with 601 receiving yards, and John Diettrich with 71 points scored.

Schedule

References

Ball State
Ball State Cardinals football seasons
Ball State Cardinals football